Jørn Lund (born 26 August 1944) is a former Danish cyclist who competed in multiple Summer Olympics. He took part in the men's 100 km team time trial in the 1972 and 1976 Olympic Games. His 1976 team, which also included Verner Blaudzun, Gert Frank, and Jørgen Hansen, won a bronze medal, finishing behind the Soviet Union and Poland and beating out West Germany and Czechoslovakia for third place.

References

External links
 
 

1944 births
Cyclists at the 1972 Summer Olympics
Cyclists at the 1976 Summer Olympics
Danish male cyclists
Living people
Medalists at the 1976 Summer Olympics
Olympic bronze medalists for Denmark
Olympic cyclists of Denmark
Olympic medalists in cycling
People from Mariagerfjord Municipality
Sportspeople from the North Jutland Region